Walter Alexander Humphreys (28 June 1878 – 1 January 1960) was an English cricketer.  Humphreys was a right-handed batsman who bowled right-arm underarm slow.  He was born at Brighton, Sussex.

Humphreys made his first-class debut for Sussex against Middlesex in 1898 County Championship.  He made thirteen further first-class appearances for the county, the last of which came against Surrey in the 1900 County Championship.  In his fourteen first-class matches for Sussex, he took a total of 48 wickets at an average of 28.18, with best figures of 5/107.  One of two five wicket hauls he took, these figures came against Hampshire in 1899.  With the bat, he scored 81 runs at a batting average of 5.78, with a high score of 27.

He died at Hove, Sussex, on 1 January 1960.  His father, Walter Humphreys Sr, played first-class cricket, as did his uncle George Humphreys.

References

External links
Walter Humphreys at ESPNcricinfo
Walter Humphreys at CricketArchive

1878 births
1960 deaths
Sportspeople from Brighton
English cricketers
Sussex cricketers